Sorgenfri station is a station on the Hillerød radial of the S-train network in Copenhagen, Denmark. It serves Sorgenfri and the southern part of Virum. It is located at Hummeltoftevej 51 and is named for the nearby Sorgenfri palace.

History

The station was established in 1936 in connection with the conversion of Nordbanen into an S-train line. The station opened on 15 May 1936. It was then located at present-day Lottenborgvej which was then called Hummeltoftevej and crossed the railway on a bridge.

The station was moved  to the northwest in connection with the construction of the Lyngby Bypass in 1955. Hummeltoftevej was also moved north and the old road was renamed Lottenborgvej after the property Lottenborg.

See also 
 List of railway stations in Denmark

References

S-train (Copenhagen) stations
Railway stations opened in 1936
1936 establishments in Denmark
Railway stations in Denmark opened in the 20th century